William T. Snyder (born October 18, 1931) is an American academic. He was the chancellor of the University of Tennessee Knoxville from 1992 to 1999. He is a former Department Head of Engineering and Mechanics and Dean of the College.

References

Living people
Northwestern University alumni
1931 births
University of Tennessee alumni